Linie 3 is a Danish musical comedy act comprising Preben Kristensen, Thomas Eje and Anders Bircow. The trio first performed in Århus in 1979 and released their first comedy LP in 1980. For their 30th anniversary in 2009, the group released a seven-DVD box.

Discography and videography 
 Show for sjov 1979 
 TV i Teltet 1980 VHS, reissued DVD
 Nej, den anden 1981 LP
 Da Jazzen Kom Til Byen 1982
 Hvem Hvad Hvoffor og Hvo'n 1982 LP
 Borte med Vesten 1983 LP and MC
 3 mand klædt af til skindet 1986 LP, MC and reissued 2012 on DVD
 10 års jubilæumsshow 1989 MC, LP and CD, VHS, reissued on DVD
 Skibet i Skilteskoven 1992 CD, DVD
 Hvor er de 2 andre? 1993 CD, DVD and VHS
 Linie 3 show ’97 1997 CD, DVD
 Rundrejsen 2001 (2001 Tour) CD, DVD
 25 års jubilæumsshow 2004 DVD
 30 års jubilæums 2009 no new show - DVD repackaging
 Linie 3 LIVE 2012

References

External links 
 Linie 3's website (Danish)

Danish male comedians